Maxus is a sounding rocket that are used in the MAXUS microgravity rocket programme, a joint venture between Swedish Space Corporation and EADS Astrium Space Transportation used by ESA. It is launched from Esrange Space Center in Sweden and provides access to microgravity for up to 14 minutes.

Technical characteristics
Overall length: 15.5 m
Overall mass: 12 400 kg
Payload mass: approx. 800 kg
Max. velocity: 3500 m/s
Max. acceleration: 15 g
Propellant mass: 10 042 kg
Motor burn time: 63 s
Microgravity: up to 14 minutes
Apogee: > 700 km
Thrust(max. in vacuum): 500 kN

Missions

See also
Texus
Maser
Rexus
Esrange

References

Sounding rockets of Sweden